The 1995 All-Atlantic Coast Conference football team consists of American football players chosen by various selectors for their All-Atlantic Coast Conference ("ACC") teams for the 1995 college football season. Selectors in 1995 included the Associated Press (AP).

Four teams dominated the AP's 1995 All-ACC selections:
 Conference champion Florida State finished the season ranked No. 4 in the final AP Poll and placed seven players on the first team: quarterback Danny Kanell, running back Warrick Dunn, wide receiver Andre Cooper, offensive tackle Jesus Hernandez, offensive guard Lewis Tyre, center Clay Shiver, and defensive lineman Reinard Wilson.
 Virginia finished the season ranked No. 16 in the final AP Poll and placed six players on the first team: running back Tiki Barber, offensive tackle Jason Augustino, defensive backs Percy Ellsworth and Ronde Barber, placekicker Rafael Garcia, and punter Will Brice.
 Clemson finished in third place in the conference and placed four players on the first team: offensive guard Will Young, linebacker Anthony Simmons, defensive back Brian Dawkins, and defensive lineman Lamarick Simpson.
 Fifth-place North Carolina also placed four players on the first team: tight end Freddie Jones, linebacker Kivuusama Mays, defensive linemen Marcus Jones and Greg Ellis.

Offensive selections

Wide receivers
 Andre Cooper, Florida State (AP-1)
 Jermaine Lewis, Maryland (AP-1)

Tackles
 Jesus Hernandez, Florida State (AP-1)
 Jason Augustino, Virginia (AP-1)

Guards
 Lewis Tyre, Florida State (AP-1)
 Will Young, Clemson (AP-1)

Centers
 Clay Shiver, Florida State (AP-1)

Tight ends
 Freddie Jones, North Carolina (AP-1)

Quarterbacks
 Danny Kanell, Florida State (AP-1)

Running backs
 Warrick Dunn, Florida State (AP-1)
 Tiki Barber, Virginia (AP-1)

Defensive selections

Defensive linemen
 Marcus Jones, North Carolina (AP-1)
 Reinard Wilson, Florida State (AP-1)
 Greg Ellis, North Carolina (AP-1)
 Lamarick Simpson, Clemson (AP-1)

Linebackers
 Anthony Simmons, Clemson (AP-1)
 Kivuusama Mays, North Carolina (AP-1)
 Tucker Grace, Wake Forest (AP-1)

Defensive backs
 Percy Ellsworth, Virginia (AP-1)
 Brian Dawkins, Clemson (AP-1)
 Ray Farmer, Duke (AP-1)
 Ronde Barber, Virginia (AP-1)

Special teams

Placekickers
 Rafael Garcia, Virginia (AP-1)

Punters
 Will Brice, Virginia (AP-1)

Key
AP = Associated Press

References

All-Atlantic Coast Conference football team
All-Atlantic Coast Conference football teams